Alphabet of the Imagination: Literary Essays of Harold Clarke Goddard, (1974) is a collection of essays and other writings by Harold Clarke Goddard.  The writings were collected and edited by his daughters, Eleanor Goddard Worthen and Margaret Goddard Holt.

Essays
I THE INNER LIGHT

Atomic Peace: the Chain Reaction of Good 
The Witch Door 
How Bright is the Inner Light? 
Grace Before Peace: Voices of the Big Four, 1945 
The Barren Fig Tree

II THE LITERARY VISION

Shakespeare
i. Hamlet to Ophelia 
ii. In Ophelia's Closet 
iii. Othello and the Race Problem
Blake's Fourfold Vision 
William James's A Pluralistic Universe 
Henry James's “The Turn of the Screw” with a Prefatory Note [1957] by Leon Edel 
W.H. Hudson: Bird-Man 
A Forward [1972] by Nevill Coghill: “Harold Goddard and John Livingston Lowes” 
Chaucer's Legend of Good Women 
An Introduction to Emerson 
A Key to Walt Whitman 
The Art of Chekhov, with Special Reference to “The Steppe” 
Russian Literature and the American Student

The Feather in the Book (quatrain) 

Essay collections
1974 non-fiction books
Essays about literature